There are three rivers named Marrecas River, all in Paraná, Brazil:

 Marrecas River (Belo River)
 Marrecas River (Santana River)
 Das Marrecas River